is a Japanese football manager and former player. He currently manager of Azul Claro Numazu. He played as a forward in his playing career.

Club career 

Playing as a forward, Nakayama made his J1 League debut on 11 March 1994. From then until 2009, he was an ever-present part of the Júbilo Iwata lineup as they were consistently one of the top teams in the J1 League since its inception. With a strike-rate of more than a goal every two games throughout his career, Nakayama was the inspirational and talismanic leader for both Júbilo Iwata and the Japanese national team.

At the 1998 World Cup finals in France, Nakayama scored the only goal of the tournament and the first goal for Japan in the history of the World Cup against Jamaica on 26 June 1998. He has scored 21 goals in 53 appearances for the Japanese national team.

Nakayama also holds the world record fastest hat-trick at international level. He managed three goals in an 2000 Asian Cup qualification match against Brunei on 16 February 2000 in only three minutes and three seconds, beating the previous record of Englishman Willie Hall set in 1938 (against Northern Ireland) by 27 seconds. This striker becomes a record-holder with other hat-tricks, that he did it in four successive games of J1 League, from 15 to 29 April in 1998. He scored 16 times in these games. The record is recognized by the Guinness Book of World Records.

On 4 December 2012, he announced his retirement at the age of 45, citing injuries to his both knees, after being J1 League's all-time leading scorer with 157 goals. In September 2015, he began to train with Azul Claro Numazu, later signing for the team as a player. Two years later, having still not made his début for Azul Claro in league or cup competition, his contract was renewed for 2017 season, a first for a professional football club.

Managerial career 
On 13 January 2020, Nakayama announced his retirement as a player at the age of 53. Having been the U-18 coach for Azul Claro Numazu for the two year prior, Nakayama revealed he was appointed the manager of Júbilo Iwata in the J2 league.

On 13 November 2022, Nakayama was appointment manager of a former player who has defended at a J3 League club Azul Claro Numazu, but has never played at numazu.

Personal Life 
Born in Shizuoka, Nakayama attended Fujieda Higashi High School and University of Tsukuba before he joined Yamaha Motors (currently; Júbilo Iwata) of the Japan Soccer League, a precursor to the J1 League, which consisted of company sponsored teams. He retired in December 2012 at age 45 after playing three seasons for Consadole Sapporo, then he came back almost three years later with Azul Claro Numazu in Japan Football League, the club has been promoted to the J3 League since 2017. He also attends by the nickname Gon Nakayama.

Career statistics

Club

International

Scores and results list Japan's goal tally first, score column indicates score after each Nakayama goal.

Managerial statistics 
Update; start of 2023 season

Honours
Júbilo Iwata
 AFC Champions League: 1998–99
 Asian Super Cup: 1999
 J1 League: 1997, 1999, 2002
 Emperor's Cup: 2003
 Japanese Super Cup: 2000, 2003, 2004

Japan
 AFC Asian Cup: 1992
 FIFA Confederations Cup Runner-up: 2001

Individual
 J.League Most Valuable Player: 1998
 J.League Top Scorer: 1998, 2000
 J.League Best XI: 1997, 1998, 2000, 2002
 J.League 20th Anniversary Team
 Japanese Footballer of the Year: 1998
 AFC Player of the Month: April 1998
 Selected to AFC All Star Team: 1999

Trivia
Nakayama is currently the all-time top goal scorer in J1 League with 157 goals. He holds the record for top scorer in a single season, scoring 36 goals in 1998.
Nakayama once portrayed himself on television, performing voice work for a guest role on the anime Hungry Heart: Wild Striker.
Nakayama appeared on the front cover of the Japanese releases of Konami's Winning Eleven video game series (World Soccer: Winning Eleven 6 and World Soccer: Winning Eleven 6 - Final Evolution) in 2002 and 2003.
He married actress Tomoko Ikuta in 1996, and together they had a daughter. Ikuta did the voice-over for lead actress Lee Young-ae in the Japanese version of the popular South Korean TV series Dae Jang Geum.
Nakayama portrayed himself in episode 19 of HappinessCharge PreCure!. This episode corresponded with the opening of the World Cup.

Notes

References

External links

 
 Japan National Football Team Database
 

1967 births
Living people
University of Tsukuba alumni
Association football people from Shizuoka Prefecture
Japanese footballers
Japanese football managers
Japan international footballers
Japan Soccer League players
J1 League players
J2 League players
J3 League players
J3 League managers
Japan Football League (1992–1998) players
Japan Football League players
Júbilo Iwata players
Hokkaido Consadole Sapporo players
Azul Claro Numazu players
Azul Claro Numazu managers
J1 League Player of the Year winners
1988 AFC Asian Cup players
1992 AFC Asian Cup players
1998 FIFA World Cup players
2001 FIFA Confederations Cup players
2002 FIFA World Cup players
AFC Asian Cup-winning players
Association football forwards
People from Fujieda, Shizuoka
Presidents of the Japan Pro-Footballers Association